Alison Lepin (born 22 June 2000 in Romorantin-Lanthenay) is a French artistic gymnast. She was a member of the team that won a bronze medal at the 2016 European Championships.

Early life 
Alison Lepin began gymnastics at the age of 9 at a club in Romorantin after doing figure skating. At the age of 11, Alison joined Avoine Beaumont Gymnastics, where she still trains. In 2012, Lepin won the French 12 year old Championships, a title that allowed her to begin competing in elite gymnastics.

Career

Junior career 
Lepin competed at the 2014 French National Championships and finished fifteenth in the all-around. She was selected to compete for the French national team for the first time in November 2014, for a friendly match against Italy and Mexico. Less than a year later, Lepin competed at both Massilia and Top Gym for France. She won gold on uneven bars at Top Gym.

Senior career 
In 2016, she competed at her first major international competition: the 2016 European Championships, in Bern, Switzerland. She helped France win the team bronze medal along with Marine Brevet, Loan His, Marine Boyer and Oréane Lechenault. This was significant for France as they had not been on a European team podium since 2008. She then competed at the 2016 National Championships where she finished seventh in the all-around and fifth on vault. Although she was the favorite to win uneven bars, she fell in the final and finished last. She was not selected for the 2016 Olympic team.

Lepin competed at the 2017 European Championships, but she did not qualify for any finals. At the end of 2017, Lepin had back surgery that kept her out of competition for a year. She was take off the national team, so she left the national training center and began training in Orléans. She came back in December 2018 for the second competition of the Top 12 Series where she scored a 12.500 on uneven bars, but, in February 2019, at the third competition, she fell on her first release and only scored an 11.700. Lepin still competes domestically, but she has only competed uneven bars since her back surgery and has not been added back to the French national team.

References 

2000 births
Living people
French female artistic gymnasts
Sportspeople from Loir-et-Cher
21st-century French women